Giuseppe Crastoni or Gioseffo Crastone or Crastona  (1674 in Pavia – 1718) was an Italian painter, mainly active as a landscape painter.

Biography
He initially studied in Pavia under Bernardino Ciceri, then moved to Rome. He returned to Pavia to open a studio for teaching painting.

References

1674 births
1718 deaths
17th-century Italian painters
Italian male painters
18th-century Italian painters
Artists from Pavia
Italian landscape painters
18th-century Italian male artists